Cyberwarfare is warfare waged in the context of computers and electronic networks.

Cyberwar or Cyber War may also refer to:

Cyberwar (video game)
Cyberwar: How Russian Hackers and Trolls Helped Elect a President, a 2018 book
Cyberwar (TV series), a Viceland documentary series 
Cyber War: The Next Threat to National Security and What to Do About It, a 2010 book by Richard A. Clarke
Avatar (2004 film), also known as Cyber Wars

See also
Electronic warfare
Virtual war
Cyberware (disambiguation)